Patty Pravo (born Nicoletta Strambelli on 9 April 1948) is an Italian singer. She debuted in 1966 and remained most successful commercially for the rest of the 1960s and throughout the 1970s. Having suffered a decline in popularity in the following decade, she experienced a career revival in the late 1990s and reinstated her position on Italian music charts. Her most popular songs include "La bambola" (1968), "Pazza idea" (1973), "Pensiero stupendo" (1978) and "...E dimmi che non vuoi morire" (1997). She scored fourteen top 10 albums (including three number ones) and fourteen top 10 singles (including two number ones) in her native Italy. Pravo participated at the Sanremo Music Festival ten times, most recently in 2019, and has won three critics' awards at the festival. She also performed twelve times at the Festivalbar.

Biography

1960s and 1970s
Strambelli studied at the conservatory institute Benedetto Marcello and was acquainted with American poet Ezra Pound and the future Pope John XXIII. At the age of fifteen she left home to live in London and then Rome, where she began her career singing in the Piper Club.

In 1966, Patty released her first single, "Ragazzo triste" (English: "Sad Boy"), the Italian version of the song "But You're Mine" by Sonny & Cher. It was met with chart success and would later become the first pop song broadcast on Vatican Radio. Pravo released another popular single in 1967, "Se perdo te" ("If I Lose You"), written by English songwriter Paul Korda and originally performed by P. P. Arnold. In 1968, Pravo released what would become one of her most popular singles and a number 1 hit, "La bambola" ("The Doll"), as well as her self-titled debut album. The LP topped the Italian albums chart and "La bambola" was awarded a gold disc. This success was followed another popular single, featuring songs "Gli occhi dell'amore" ("The Eyes of Love") and "Sentimento" ("Feeling"). Pravo's second album, Concerto per Patty, was released in 1969 and included more high-charting singles: "Tripoli 1969" and "Il paradiso" ("Paradise"), the latter written by Lucio Battisti and performed at Festivalbar.

Pravo took part in the Sanremo Music Festival 1970 with the song "La spada nel cuore" ("A Sword in the Heart") performed in duet with Little Tony, coming fifth in the contest. In 1970, she released another album called Patty Pravo which charted in the top 10 of the Italian chart and included the hit Festivalbar song "Per te" ("For You"). She also scored a major hit with "Tutt'al più" in 1971 from the album Bravo Pravo. To change her image and artistic direction, Pravo recorded an album trilogy for Philips Records, released between 1971 and 1972, consisting of more sophisticated and complex material. In 1972, she married Italian designer Franco Baldieri, but they soon separated.

In 1973, the singer reunited with her previous label RCA and released what would become one of the biggest hits of her career, the number 1 single "Pazza idea" ("Crazy Idea"). The song's parent album, also titled Pazza idea, peaked at the top of the Italian albums chart. It was followed by another chart-topping LP, Mai una signora (Never a Lady, 1974) which spawned the popular single "Come un Pierrot" ("Like a Pierrot") and the Festivalbar song "Quale signora" ("Which Lady"). Albums Incontro (The Meeting) and Tanto (So Much), released in 1975 and 1976, respectively, both placed within the top 10 in Italy and included successful singles of the same names. Tanto was a collaboration with Vangelis, who arranged songs and played keyboards on the album. In 1977, Patty scored a hit with the song "Tutto il mondo è casa mia" ("The Whole World Is My Home") which reached no. 3 in the Italian singles chart.

In 1978, alongside Amanda Lear and Grace Jones, Pravo appeared in a controversial Italian TV show, Stryx, where in each episode she would perform a song from her new album, Miss Italia. The LP was another top 10 success in Italy and also included the song "Pensiero stupendo" ("Wonderful Thought") which reached no. 2 and would become one of the biggest hits of Patty's career. In 1979, the singer had another top 20 hit with "Autostop" from the LP Munich Album.

1980s and 1990s
The singer posed nude for the Italian edition of Playboy in 1980 and, prompted by resulting hostility from the Italian press later moved to the USA. Her career declined in the 1980s and subsequent albums failed to match the commercial success of her earlier work, with the next LP, Cerchi (Circles), being of her lowest-charting records to date. In 1982, she married American guitarist John Edward Johnson. Her 1984 single "Per una bambola" ("For a Doll") was a modest chart success and won the critics' award at the Sanremo Festival. However, the song's parent album, Occulte persuasioni (Hidden Persuasions), passed fairly unnoticed. In 1985, she had a moderate chart success with the song "Menù" ("Menu") which she also performed at the Festivalbar.

In 1987, she entered the Sanremo Festival contest again. Her song "Pigramente signora" ("Lazily a Lady") did not fare well and the singer was accused of plagiarizing Dan Fogelberg's track "To the Morning". The controversy led to the cancellation of her new contract with Virgin Records. Her next album, Oltre l'Eden... (Beyond Eden...), was produced by Paolo Dossena and released by Fonit Cetra in 1989. Although it was not a chart success, it met with positive critical reception and is often regarded as one of Pravo's best works. The title track took part in the Festivalbar song contest. In 1990, Pravo was due to perform the song "Donna con te" ("A Woman with You") at Sanremo, but shortly before the event, she refused to sing it over its lyrics. The song was then given to Anna Oxa to perform at the festival. In the same year, she released an album of re-recordings of her classic hits.

In 1992, Pravo was arrested for possessing hashish, but was released after only 3 days. In 1994, the singer traveled to China, where she would make history as the first Italian artist to perform in that country. Chinese music and culture provided inspiration for her next album, Ideogrammi, entirely produced in China. In 1995, Pravo returned to Sanremo with the song "I giorni dell'armonia" ("Days of Harmony"), which was met with lukewarm reception at the festival, but peaked within the top 20 in Italy.

The singer celebrated the 30th anniversary of her musical debut in 1996, embarking on a greatest hits tour, and in 1997 once again performed at Sanremo Festival, with the song "...E dimmi che non vuoi morire" ("...And Tell Me You Don't Want to Die") winning the Mia Martini Critics Award and came 8th in the general voting contest. The single was a big chart success, peaking at number 2 in Italy (her highest-charting song since the 1970s), and her first live album Bye Bye Patty charted in the top 5. On her next studio album, Notti, guai e libertà (Nights, Trouble and Freedom), Pravo worked with some renowned Italian songwriters, including Ivano Fossati, Franco Battiato and Lucio Dalla. The album was another top 10 commercial success, and was followed by a tour. The songs "Les etrangers" ("Strangers") and "Strada per un'altra città" ("Road to Another City") were performed at Festivalbar.

After 2000

Her next album, Una donna da sognare (2000), peaked at no. 6, thus becoming one of her highest-charting albums ever, and the title song became a hit single. Released in 2002, Radio Station also charted within the top 10, and the first single, "L'immenso", was Patty's return to Sanremo Festival, where it took the 16th place. The singer then embarked on another long tour. Her 2004 album, Nic-Unic, was a collaboration with young songwriters and presented an innovative, avant garde sound, with most songs co-written by Patty Pravo herself. The single "Che uomo sei" ("What Kind of Man Are You") was a chart success. In 2007, she released the album Spero che ti piaccia... Pour toi (I Hope You Like It... For You), a homage to Dalida, with a selection of her songs performed in French, Italian and Arabic. Later in the year, Pravo released an autobiography Bla, bla, bla....

To commemorate the fortieth anniversary of her hit "La bambola", the singer released a new version of the song. She embarked on another tour, what would result in a successful double live album Live Arena di Verona – Sold Out, recorded at Verona Arena. She took part in Sanremo Festival with the song "E io verrò un giorno là" ("And I'll Be There One Day") in 2009, without much success, and again in 2011, performing "Il vento e le rose" ("The Wind and the Roses"), which also did not turn out popular. Her next studio album, Nella terra dei pinguini (In the Land of the Penguins), charted within Italian top 20. In 2012, she released the single "Com'è bello far l'amore" ("How Nice It Is to Make Love") from Fausto Brizzi's film of the same name, and the song went on to win the "Italian Golden Globe".

She made a cameo appearance as herself in the 2014 Greek film Xenia, directed by Panos H. Koutras, which tells about two brothers who are obsessed with her music. In 2016, Pravo performed the song "Cieli immensi" ("Immense Skies") at the Sanremo Festival, placing 6th and winning her third critics' award. The single was very successful commercially, reaching the top 20 hit in Italy, and the accompanying album Eccomi (Here I Am) peaked at no. 6. She published her second autobiography, La cambio io la vita che..., in 2017. In 2019, Pravo participated in the Sanremo Festival contest for the tenth time, with the song "Un po' come la vita" ("A Little Like Life") performed in duet with Italian singer Briga. The track was not successful, placing only at the 21st position. Pravo simultaneously released her next studio album, Red, which charted in the top 20 in Italy.

Discography

Studio albums

Live albums

Compilation albums

Singles

Participation at festivals

Sanremo Music Festival
 1970: "La spada nel cuore" (with Little Tony) – 5th place
 1984: "Per una bambola" – 10th place and critics' award
 1987: "Pigramente signora" – 20th place
 1995: "I giorni dell'armonia" – 20th place
 1997: "...E dimmi che non vuoi morire" – 8th place and critics' award
 2002: "L'immenso" – 16th place
 2009: "E io verrò un giorno là"
 2011: "Il vento e le rose"
 2016: "Cieli immensi" – 6th place and critics' award
 2019: "Un po' come la vita" (with Briga) – 21st place

Festivalbar
 1969: "Il paradiso"
 1970: "Per te"
 1974: "Quale signora"
 1975: "Incontro"
 1976: "Tanto" – outside the contest
 1978: "Johnny" – outside the contest
 1985: "Menù"
 1987: "Contatto"
 1989: "Oltre l'Eden..."
 1997: "Pensiero stupendo '97"
 1998: "Les etrangers" and "Strada per un'altra città"
 2000: "Una donna da sognare" and "Una mattina d'estate"

Filmography
Una ragazza tutta d'oro (1967)
L'immensità (1967) 
I ragazzi di Bandiera Gialla (1967) 
 The Most Beautiful Couple in the World (1968)
Xenia (2014)
Drag Race Italia (2022)

Autobiographies
 2007: Bla, bla, bla...
 2017: La cambio io la vita che...

References

External links

1948 births
Beat musicians
English-language singers from Italy
French-language singers of Italy
Living people
Musicians from Venice
Pop rock singers
Spanish-language singers of Italy